An unregistered trademark or common law trademark is an enforceable mark created by a business or individual to signify or distinguish a product or service. It is legally different from a registered trademark granted by statute.

As with registered trademarks, a common law trademark utilizes graphics, images, words or symbols, or a combination of such, to signify the distinctiveness or source of a product or service.

Although not required by law to do so, an unregistered trademark owner can append the mark with the letters "TM" (visualized by the trademark symbol ™). A ™ serves as notice to the public the words or symbols are an unregistered trademark. In contrast, trademarks granted by the United States Patent and Trademark Office (USPTO) may have the ® symbol next to the trademark. U.S. Federal law prohibits an unregistered trademark owner gaining any benefit from using the ® with the trademark.

A significant distinction of an unregistered trademark is the trademark owner does not receive as much protection as the owner of a federal or state registered trademark. For example, in the United States the owner of a trademark registered by the USPTO can enforce the trademark in all U.S. states, sue for damages (including lost profits), and significantly, recover attorneys' fees and costs incurred in protecting the trademark against infringement. If a trademark owner registers in a state, the trademark owner can enforce the trademark throughout the entire state, and receive similar statutory remedies.

In the United States, neither federal nor state registration is required to obtain common law trademark protection, albeit the protection may be limited. In contrast to federal registration, common law trademarks are usually enforceable only within the geographic region or locale where the trademark owner is using it in business. When an infringement occurs, an unregistered trademark owner may not be able to sue and collect damages or recover attorneys fees. In those jurisdictions with limited protection to unregistered trademark owners, a common law trademark owner's remedies may be limited to injunctive relief (a court order for the defendant to cease and desist the infringement).

An unregistered trademark may receive protection under the federal "Lanham Act" (15 USC § 1125), which includes prohibition against commercial misrepresentation of source or origins of goods. Unlike other trademark statutory provisions, a claim under the Lanham Act may permit a party to recover attorneys' fees and costs.

Some U.S. states follow a first use rule when determining trademark ownership (such as California). Significantly, under the first use in commerce rule an unregistered trademark owner can defeat a later-filed federal or state registered trademark, if the unregistered trademark owner can show first use in commerce before the date of the registered trademark.

States that do not follow the first use rule resolve trademark ownership disputes by determining who first filed for registration of a trademark. Regardless of use in commerce, if a business or individual later files to register the trademark, the filing to register will take precedence over an unregistered common law trademark holder's use of the trademark. The first to file is declared the owner of the trademark. In first-to-file states this sometimes causes a race to file an application because a granted registration may provide protection to the date the trademark owner first filed the trademark application.

References

Trademark law